Gullesfjorden is a fjord that cuts into the island of Hinnøya in Troms og Finnmark county, Norway. It is located mostly within Kvæfjord Municipality, although a small part in the northwestern part of the fjord lies in Sortland Municipality in Nordland county. The inner head of the ford is known as Gullesfjordbotn.

The other two branches are the Godfjorden and Kvæfjorden. The Gullesfjorden has a smaller feeder fjord entering from the southwest called Austerfjorden.

References

Fjords of Troms og Finnmark
Kvæfjord